The Holy Trinity Episcopal Church, formerly the Evangelical Free Church, is a historic church building at 446 Hamilton Street in Southbridge, Massachusetts.  Built in 1869 for a nominally non-denominational congregation of senior Hamilton Woolen Company employees, it has house an Episcopal congregation since 1921.  The building is architecturally noted for its Romanesque and Gothic Revival features, and was listed on the National Register of Historic Places in 1989.

Description and history
The church is located on the north side of Hamilton Street, east of (and across the Quinebaug River from) the former Hamilton Woolen Company mill complex.  It is a roughly rectangular brick building, with a steeply pitched front-facing gable roof.  A tower rises at the southwest corner, its open belfry framed by paired round-arch openings and topped by a pyramidal roof with a flared edge.  The building features are mainly Romanesque, with round-arch windows, paneled nave walls, and corbelled eaves.  However, it also has Victorian Gothic touches, including its front entry porch and polychromatic slate roof.

The church was built in 1869 by the Hamilton Woolen Company for a nominally non-denominational congregation of its senior employees and owners.  The congregation was in practice Congregationalist, and was sometimes referred to derisively as the "Church of the Holy Supervisors".  In 1921, with its enrollment declining, the company sold the building to the Holy Trinity Episcopalian congregation, which had been accumulating a building fund since 1909.  It was severely damaged by fires in 1930 and 1940, but rebuilt after each one.  The parish hall, which extends to the right of the main building, was added in 1958.

See also
National Register of Historic Places listings in Southbridge, Massachusetts
National Register of Historic Places listings in Worcester County, Massachusetts

References

External links
Holy Trinity Episcopal Church web site

Churches on the National Register of Historic Places in Massachusetts
Gothic Revival church buildings in Massachusetts
Churches completed in 1869
19th-century Episcopal church buildings
Churches in Worcester County, Massachusetts
National Register of Historic Places in Southbridge, Massachusetts
1869 establishments in Massachusetts
Churches in Southbridge, Massachusetts